The 1966–67 Auburn Tigers men's basketball team represented Auburn University in the 1966–67 college basketball season. The team's head coach was Bill Lynn, who was in his fourth season at Auburn. The team played their home games at Auburn Sports Arena in Auburn, Alabama. They finished the season 17–8, 12–6 in SEC play.

References

Auburn Tigers men's basketball seasons
Auburn
Auburn Tigers
Auburn Tigers